The Bibliothèque Nationale de Mauritanie (English: National Library of Mauritania, Arabic: المكتبة الوطنية الموريتانية) is located in Nouakchott, Mauritania in the building of the National Museum of Mauritania. The library has a collection of 10,000 volumes and employs 41 staff members. The library has seven branches.

See also 
 National Archives of Mauritania
 List of national libraries

References

Bibliography
  
  
  

Mauritania
Buildings and structures in Nouakchott
Education in Mauritania
Educational organisations based in Mauritania
Libraries in Mauritania